Saint-Aubin-de-Terregatte is a commune in the Manche department in Normandy in north-western France.

See also
Communes of the Manche department

References

Saintaubindeterregatte